Mons Lid (8 April 1896 – 3 March 1967) was a Norwegian politician of the Labour Party who served as Minister of Finance from 1955 to 1956 under Einar Gerhardsen. He also served as County Governor of Hordaland from 1949 to 1966.

References

1896 births
1967 deaths
Ministers of Finance of Norway
Members of the Storting
Labour Party (Norway) politicians
20th-century Norwegian politicians